The UConn Huskies women's ice hockey program represented the University of Connecticut Huskies during the 2017–18 NCAA Division I women's ice hockey season.

Offseason

Recruiting

Standings

Roster

2017–18 Huskies

Schedule

|-
!colspan=12 style=""| Regular Season

|-
!colspan=12 style=""| WHEA Tournament

Awards and honors

Sources

References

Connecticut
UConn Huskies women's ice hockey seasons
Conn
Connect
Connect